Neil McDermott (born 15 December 1980) is a British stage and television actor, who is best known for portraying Ryan Malloy in the BBC television soap opera EastEnders.

Career
McDermott appeared in the 2008 Doctor Who episode "The Next Doctor", as well as Casualty and Rosemary and Thyme, amongst others, the feature films Goal! and Blooded, and various stage productions including The Sound of Music in the West End. He trained at the Mountview Academy of Theatre Arts. He joined the cast of EastEnders in 2009. In June 2011, Digital Spy reported that McDermott was leaving EastEnders. An EastEnders spokesperson said, "We can confirm Neil is leaving EastEnders. It was a mutual decision that was made before Christmas when Neil's contract came up for renewal and we wish him all the best for the future. His exit storyline will be dramatic and fans will not be disappointed."

McDermott replaced fellow Enders actor Nigel Harman as Lord Farquaad in Shrek the Musical at the Theatre Royal, Drury Lane in London's West End on 29 February 2012. The production played its final performance 24 February 2013 with McDermott as Farquaad. McDermott briefly reprised the role of Ryan Malloy in EastEnders. in 2014, 2016 and will reprise the role of Ryan again breafly in Feb 2023.

In 2022, McDermott played Daedalus in the cast album for new musical The Minotaur.

Personal life
McDermott is married to actress Michelle Edwards. They have a daughter, born in January 2011 and a son. 

Neil and his wife Michelle opened Mishmak Youth Theatre in January 2010.

In September 2011 he ran the Great North Run with Charlie Brooks in aid of Marie Curie Cancer Care.

Credits

Film and TV

Theatre credits

Awards and nominations

References

External links
 
 Neil McDermott on TV.com
 

English male television actors
English people of Irish descent
1980 births
Living people
Male actors from Lancashire
People from Southport